Dashtabad (also Romanized as Dashtābād; also known as Sa‘ādatābād) is a village in Posht Rud Rural District, in the Central District of Narmashir County, Kerman Province, Iran. At the 2006 census, its population was 683, in 161 families.

References 

Populated places in Narmashir County